Pittsburg, Kentucky is an unincorporated community and coal town in Laurel County, Kentucky.  It was named for the industrial heritage of Pittsburgh, Pennsylvania. Their post office has been open since 1882

References

Unincorporated communities in Laurel County, Kentucky
Unincorporated communities in Kentucky
Coal towns in Kentucky